Glipidiomorpha intermedia is a species of beetle in the genus Glipidiomorpha of the family Mordellidae, which is part of the superfamily Tenebrionoidea. It was described in 1955 by Francisco.

References

Beetles described in 1955
Mordellidae